Sadakatsu (written:  or ) is a masculine Japanese given name. Notable people with the name include:

, Japanese daimyō
, Japanese samurai

Japanese masculine given names